Meregalli is an Italian surname. Notable people with the surname include:

Guido Meregalli (1894–1959), Italian racing driver
Luca Meregalli (born 1991), Italian footballer

Italian-language surnames